Size functions are shape descriptors, in a geometrical/topological sense. They are functions from the half-plane  to the natural numbers, counting certain connected components of a topological space. They are used in pattern recognition and topology.

Formal definition
In size theory, the size function  associated with the size pair  is defined in the following way. For every ,  is equal to the number of connected components of the set 
 that contain at least one point at which the measuring function (a continuous function from a topological space  to 

)  takes a value smaller than or equal to 
.
The concept of size function can be easily extended to the case of a measuring function , where  is endowed with the usual partial order
. 
A survey about size functions (and size theory) can be found in.

History and applications
Size functions were introduced in

for the particular case of  equal to the topological space of all piecewise  closed paths in a  closed manifold embedded in a Euclidean space.
-norm, while the measuring function  takes each path  to its length.
In

the case of  equal to the topological space of all ordered -tuples of points in a submanifold of a Euclidean space is considered.

An extension of the concept of size function to algebraic topology was made in

where the concept of size homotopy group was introduced.
An extension to homology theory (the size functor) was introduced in
.
The concepts of size homotopy group and size functor are strictly related to the concept of persistent homology group

studied in persistent homology. It is worth to point out that the size function is the rank of the -th persistent homology group, while the relation between the persistent homology group
and the size homotopy group is analogous to the one existing between homology groups and homotopy groups.

Size functions have been initially introduced as a mathematical tool for shape comparison in computer vision and pattern recognition, and have constituted the seed of size theory.
The main point is that size functions are invariant for every transformation preserving the measuring function. Hence, they can be adapted to many different applications, by simply changing the measuring function in order to get the wanted invariance. Moreover, size functions show properties of relative resistance to noise, depending on the fact that they distribute the information all over the half-plane .

Main properties
Assume that  is a compact locally connected Hausdorff space. The following statements hold:

 every size function  is a non-decreasing function in the variable  and a non-increasing function in the variable .
 every size function  is locally right-constant in both its variables.
 for every ,  is finite.
 for every  and every , .

A strong link between the concept of size function and the concept of natural pseudodistance
 between the size pairs  exists.

 if  then .

The previous result gives an easy way to get lower bounds for the natural pseudodistance and is one of the main motivation to introduce the concept of size function.

Representation by formal series

An algebraic representation of size
functions in terms of collections of points and lines in the real plane with
multiplicities, i.e. as particular formal series, was furnished in

.
The points (called cornerpoints) and lines (called cornerlines) of such formal series encode the information about
discontinuities of the corresponding size functions, while
their multiplicities contain the information about the values taken by the
size function.

Formally:

 
is positive.
 cornerlines and are defined as those lines  such that
 
 Representation Theorem: For every  , it holds
.

This representation contains the 
same amount of information about the shape under study as the original 
size function does, but is much more concise.

This algebraic approach to size functions leads to the definition of new similarity measures 
between shapes, by translating the problem of comparing size functions into 
the problem of comparing formal series. The most studied among these metrics between size function is the matching distance.

References

See also
 Size theory
 Natural pseudodistance
 Size functor
 Size homotopy group
 Size pair
 Matching distance
 Topological data analysis

Topology
Algebraic topology